Jacques Mieses (born Jacob Mieses; 27 February 1865 – 23 February 1954) was a German-born British chess player. He was one of the inaugural recipients of the title International Grandmaster from FIDE in 1950. He became a naturalized British citizen after World War II.p258

Chess career
Born Jacob Mieses in Leipzig, Germany in 1865, his early successes as an adult chess player included a tie for second at Leipzig and third at Nuremberg in 1888. However, he was quickly eclipsed by two rising young superstars, Emanuel Lasker and Siegbert Tarrasch. Mieses attained maturity as a player in 1895, just after turning 30, when he contested the 9th Chess Congress in Leipzig, followed by an exhibition tour in Russia and then a match with David Janowski. His participation in the great Hastings tournament that year was important to his growth as a mature chess master despite a 20th-place finish.

Mieses was a dangerous attacker with a number of famous victories to his credit, e.g. against Frank Marshall (Monte Carlo 1903). His best achievement was to win the first Trebitsch Memorial at Vienna 1907, and he came third at the 28-round Masters tournament at Ostend the same year.

He organized the 1911 San Sebastian master tournament and insisted that all the masters' expenses were paid. This was the first international tournament of José Raúl Capablanca, who surprised everyone by winning.

After the Nazi takeover of Germany, the Jewish Mieses moved to the UK. In 1950, he became the first FIDE-authorized British grandmaster, though not (as is sometimes claimed) the first British grandmaster. ("Grandmaster" is a title first used of chess players in the 19th century,p156 and a number of British players were considered to be grandmasters in their day, such as Howard Staunton and Joseph Blackburne). When FIDE first awarded the grandmaster title in 1950, Mieses was one of the 27 original recipients, and the oldest of them.

Mieses, now past the age of 70, settled in England in 1938 following Kristallnacht in Germany, and arrived with just 15 Reichsmarks in his pocket. He continued to actively play chess and participated in his last major event at Hastings 1946, when he was 80 years old and half a century after Hastings 1895. The octogenarian Mieses only won a single game against a 22-year-old opponent, but secured the brilliancy prize for a game-winning attack combination. Three years later, at 84, he defeated the 86-year-old Dutch master Dirk van Foreest,  afterwards commenting "Youth has been victorious" and also gave a series of exhibition matches in western Europe. He died in February 1954, a few days before his 89th birthday.

Mieses's professional chess career lasted 64 years, a record that still stands as of 2018. His durability at an advanced age was attributed to his belief in physical fitness; he engaged in daily swims until almost the end of his life.

Mieses wrote many tournament reports, but his style was regarded as fairly dry, in contrast with his wittiness in person.

Legacy

Mieses largely adhered to the 19th century Romantic school of play and showed little aptitude for positional chess. He used almost exclusively e4 openings and he was the last chess master of note to make any serious use of the Center Game and Vienna Game. On the Black side of an e4 opening, he generally used the French Defense or Sicilian Defense. The Queen's Gambit and Dutch Defense were his usual replies to d4 openings.

He often used the Scandinavian Defense and greatly developed its theory in the early 1900s. The chess opening 1.d3 is named the Mieses Opening. He is also known for the Mieses Variation of the Vienna Game, which runs 1.e4 e5. 2.Nc3 Nf6 (or 2...Nc6) 3.g3. Its king bishop fianchetto can be seen as an early example of hypermodernism. There is also a line in the Scotch Game named The Mieses Variation (1.e4 e5 2.Nf3 Nc6 3.d4 exd4 4.Nxd4 Nf6 5.Nxc6 bxc6 6.e5) after he employed it four times at Hastings 1895.p213

See also
 List of Jewish chess players

References

External links 
 
 Jacques Mieses - Information, Pictures and Games (in German)
 Remembering Jacques Mieses
 “Jacques Mieses” by Edward Winter”

1865 births
1954 deaths
Sportspeople from Leipzig
Jewish chess players
German chess players
British chess players
Chess grandmasters
Chess Olympiad competitors
Chess theoreticians
British non-fiction writers
German chess writers
British chess writers
German male non-fiction writers
British male writers
Jewish emigrants from Nazi Germany to the United Kingdom
Naturalised citizens of the United Kingdom
People from the Kingdom of Saxony